As of 2018, ten firms in Germany rank among the world's biggest publishers of books in terms of revenue: C.H. Beck, Bertelsmann, Holtzbrinck Publishing Group, Springer Nature, Thieme, and Westermann Druck- und Verlagsgruppe. Overall, "Germany has some 2,000 publishing houses, and more than 90,000 titles reach the public each year, a production surpassed only by the United States." Unlike many other countries, "book publishing is not centered in a single city but is concentrated fairly evenly in Berlin, Hamburg, and the regional metropolises of Cologne, Frankfurt, Stuttgart, and Munich."

History 

In the 1450s in Mainz, Johannes Gutenberg printed a Bible using movable metal type, a technique that quickly spread to other German towns and throughout Europe.

In the 1930s Nazis conducted book burnings.

German publishers issued around 61,000 book titles in 1990, and around 83,000 in 2000.

Fairs
The influential Frankfurt Book Fair began in 1454, and the  Leipzig Book Fair in 1632.

Collections

Outside of Germany, collections of German books include those stored in the UK at the British Library and London Library; in the US at Harvard University and Yale University.

In popular culture
In 2006 a temporary sculpture about German book history was installed at Bebelplatz in Berlin as part of the Walk of Ideas.

See also

 Copyright law of Germany
 Legal deposit: Germany
 Börsenverein des Deutschen Buchhandels
 
 Verzeichnis der im deutschen Sprachbereich erschienenen Drucke des 16. Jahrhunderts
 Verzeichnis der im deutschen Sprachraum erschienenen Drucke des 17. Jahrhunderts
 
 German literature
 Media of Germany
 Open access in Germany to scholarly communication

Notes

References 

 This article incorporates information from the German Wikipedia.

Bibliography

in English
 
 . Part 2
 
 
 
  (Includes info about Germany)
 
  (Includes articles about book clubs, publishing, etc.)

in German
 
 
 
  1958-
 
  Multiple volumes, 2001-

Filmography
 How to Make a Book with Steidl, 2010; about Steidl publisher in Göttingen

Images

External links 

  (Bibliography of editions published in present-day Germany; also browsable by town)
  
  (Bibliography)

Germany
Mass media in Germany
Book publishing in Germany
 
Libraries in Germany